is a Japanese light novel series written by Shoji Goji. The series originated on the Shōsetsuka ni Narō website in October 2016, before being published in print with illustrations by Booota and Saku Enokimaru by Overlap beginning in January 2018. A manga adaptation, illustrated by Bibi, began serialization on the Comic Gardo website in January 2019.

Media

Light novel
Written by Shoji Goji, the series began publication on the novel posting website Shōsetsuka ni Narō on October 12, 2016. The series was later acquired by Overlap, who began publishing the series in print with illustrations by Booota and Saku Enokimaru on January 25, 2018. As of February 2023, eleven volumes have been released.

In February 2021, Seven Seas Entertainment announced that they licensed the series for English publication.

Volume list

Manga
A manga adaptation, illustrated by Bibi, began serialization on the Comic Gardo manga website on January 25, 2019. As of February 2023, the manga's individual chapters have been collected into fifteen tankōbon volumes.

In March 2020, Kaiten Books announced that they licensed the manga for English publication.

Volume list

Reception
Rebecca Silverman from Anime News Network praised the humor and illustrations, though she had mixed feelings on the character Haruka. Demelza from Anime UK News praised the story, especially its action and comedy elements.

The series has 1.9 million copies in circulation between its digital and print releases.

References

External links
  
  
  
 

2018 Japanese novels
Anime and manga based on light novels
Isekai anime and manga
Isekai novels and light novels
Japanese webcomics
Light novels
Light novels first published online
Overlap Bunko
Seven Seas Entertainment titles
Shōnen manga
Shōsetsuka ni Narō
Webcomics in print